The Nikon PC-E Nikkor 24mm f/3.5D ED Lens is a tilt-shift, wide-angle prime lens that provides the equivalent of the corresponding view camera front movements on Nikon F-mount camera bodies.  Its ultra-wide perspective control features tilt, shift and rotation capability, well-suited for architectural and nature photography.

The lens is designed for Nikon's full frame (FX) cameras, such as the Nikon D610, Nikon D750, Nikon D810, Nikon D700, Nikon D800, Nikon D600, Nikon D3, Nikon D4, and Nikon D5, for which it provides an 84° angle of view. It can be used with Nikon DX format cameras with the angle of view reduced to 61° (equivalent to a 36mm lens). The lens allows an 8.5° tilt with respect to the film or sensor plane and 11mm shift with respect to the center of the image area. Each movement can be rotated ±90° about the lens axis.

This lens features automatic aperture control.  When it is mounted on a compatible Nikon camera, the user can use all exposure modes to take photographs without operating the aperture stop-down button.  Previous Nikkor PC lenses cannot do this.

On October 19, 2016, Nikon introduced a wider-angle shift-tilt lens, the 19mm 4 Nikkor PC-E ED Lens. With similar features to the 24mm earlier lens, it has a bulbous protruding lens element needed to reach the 19mm angle.

See also 
Canon TS-E 24mm lens
Perspective control
Perspective control lens
Nikon F-mount#Perspective control (PC) lenses

References

External links 
Owner's manual for the PC-E Nikkor 24mm 3.5 lens
Review by Digital Camera Info
Review by Lens Database
Tutorial on tilt shift axis change
 Rokinon 24mm shift lens

Nikon F-mount lenses
Perspective-control lenses
Camera lenses introduced in 2008